The Svitava is a river in the Pardubice and South Moravian regions of the Czech Republic. The Svitava rises near Svitavy, passes through Blansko, and flows into the Svratka in Brno.

Etymology
The river's name referred to its clear water and was derived from svítat, which meant "be clear" in Old Czech. The river is first documented in 1125 in Chronica Boemorum.

References

Rivers of the Pardubice Region
Rivers of the South Moravian Region
Blansko District
Svitavy District